Stade Léo Lagrange is a stadium in Besançon, France.  It is currently used for football matches and is the home stadium of Racing Besançon. The stadium holds 10,500 spectators.

On 31 January 2014, it hosted a Six Nations Under 20s Championship match between France and England with France winning 21 - 15.

External links
Stadium information

Leo Lagrange
Velodromes in France
Racing Besançon
Buildings and structures in Besançon
Tourist attractions in Besançon
Sports venues completed in 1939
Sports venues in Doubs